In Suspicious Circumstances is a British true crime drama television series produced by Granada Television for ITV between 3 June 1991 and 11 October 1996. Re-enactments of historical crimes were introduced by Edward Woodward.

Granada's Head of Factual Drama Ian McBride described the show as revisiting "an atmospheric past as Edward Woodward intrigues the viewer by walking through period sets and examining the unknown quirks of a crime gone by."

In 1996, several writers accused the show of plagiarism. However, Granada executives claimed that their researchers had used the same source materials as the claimants. Of the 21 claims of copyright infringement which were heard in court, four were upheld and the rest dismissed.

Boxtree published a tie-in book featuring 11 true cases of infamous crimes from the 1870s to the 1980s.

On 12 November 2022, Talking Pictures TV began repeating the series on Saturday evenings.

References

External links

1991 British television series debuts
1996 British television series endings
ITV television dramas
ITV crime dramas
1990s British crime drama television series
1990s British anthology television series
Television series by ITV Studios
Television shows produced by Granada Television
English-language television shows